Alana Maree "Lonni" Alameda (born June 11, 1970) is an American softball coach who is the current head coach at Florida State. She has been head coach at Florida State since 2009, in addition to the USSSA Pride of National Pro Fastpitch from 2016 to 2017.

Early life and education
Alameda graduated from Oak Ridge High School in El Dorado Hills, California in 1988. After pitching at St. Mary's University, Texas in the 1989 season, during which St. Mary's made the NAIA Tournament, Alameda transferred to Oklahoma and went on to earn two second-team All-Big Eight awards on the softball team in addition to playing volleyball. Alameda graduated from Oklahoma with a communications degree in 1992 and played professional softball in the Netherlands in 1993.

Coaching career

College assistant (1994–2003)
In 1994 and 1995, Alameda was an assistant coach at Division II Barry University. From 1996 to 2003, Alameda was an assistant coach at Stanford under Sandy Pearce in 1996 and John Rittman beginning in 1997, during which Stanford went 320–179–1 and made six straight NCAA Tournaments.

UNLV (2004–2008)
After going 25–35 in her first season as head coach of UNLV in 2004, Alameda led UNLV to a historically best 44–19 record in 2005 and first NCAA Tournament appearance in nine  years, for which Alameda earned Mountain West Conference (MWC) Coach of the Year honors. UNLV went 26–37 in 2006 but improved to 37–27 in 2007, Alameda's second time as MWC Coach of the Year. The 2008 UNLV team began with a 9–1–1 record and the first top-25 ranking in program history, but injuries to four starters caused the team to finish 25–40–1.

Florida State (2009–present)
Alameda debuted at Florida State in 2009 with a 44–19 record and NCAA Regional appearance.

USSSA Pride (2016–2017)

Head coaching record

College

NPF

References

1970 births
Living people
Female sports coaches
American softball coaches
Oklahoma Sooners softball players
St. Mary's Rattlers softball players
Softball coaches from California
Barry Buccaneers softball coaches
Florida State Seminoles softball coaches
Stanford Cardinal softball coaches
UNLV Rebels softball coaches
People from El Dorado Hills, California
Sportspeople from Sacramento County, California
Softball players from California